The Lexus RC (Japanese: レクサス・RC, Rekusasu RC) is a compact executive two-door coupé manufactured by Lexus, Toyota's luxury division. The RC which according to Lexus stands for "Radical Coupe" is a two-door coupé version of the Lexus IS (XE30). The RC is designated as the XC10 series. The RC borrowed styling from the LF-LC concept and was previewed by the LF-CC concept, being designed as a proposal by Pansoo Kwon from 2010 to early 2012 and approved by supervising designers Yasuo Kajino and Tatsuya Takei.

Overview 
The RC was unveiled at the 2013 Tokyo Motor Show.

The RC has a shorter wheelbase than the Lexus IS (XE30) though it is longer overall. The platform shares the front end of the Lexus GS (L10), midsection from the Lexus IS (XE20) convertible, while the rear componentry is from the XE30 series IS. The RC has three LED lamps in the triangular headlights and 18-inch five-spoke alloy wheels as standard, or 19-inch ten-spoke wheels as option.

Japan models were set to go on sale in the second half of 2014. Early models include RC 350 and RC 300h.
US sales began in November 2014. In Japan, ownership of the version with the 5.0 litre engine is expensive due to the annual Japanese road tax obligation.

Initially, the RC was available with a choice of three engines; the RC 300h with the 2.5-liter 2AR-FSE inline-four engine mated to a continuously variable transmission, the RC 350 with the 3.5-liter 2GR-FSE V6 (which was later replaced with the 2GR-FKS from model year 2018 on), and the RC F with 5.0-liter 2UR-GSE V8. The RC 200t (now called RC 300), featuring a 2.0-liter 8AR-FTS I4 turbocharged petrol engine, was added to the range in late 2015. All-wheel drive is offered for the RC 300h and RC 350.  Lexus RC AWD versions use a full-time all-wheel drive system that utilizes a planetary gearset center differential coupled with a multi-disc clutch to act as the slip limiting device. The planetary gearset provides a 30:70 front-to-rear torque split under normal conditions for handling agility, however the system can allow for a torque split of up to 50:50 to control wheel slip.

Variants of the RC series have all-wheel steering, 2 piece brake rotors, variable suspension dampers, and a Torsen limited slip differential.

, the trim levels are "Version L" and "F-Sport".

While comfort and luxury were the aim of the RC series, sportiness was also part of the equation, although its heavy curb weight dampens the car's performance driving capability especially against the RCs direct competitors such as the BMW 440i and Audi A5.

TRD produces a bodykit, several aerodynamic and performance parts for the RC 350, these include an exhaust system, a rear diffuser, lightweight forged aluminium wheels with Michelin Pilot Super Sport tires, etc. The options are dealer fitted and are available only in Japan.

Facelift 

The RC received its first facelift in August 2018, with official images revealed ahead of its 2018 Paris Motor Show debut, which took place a few weeks after. The corporate 'L' shaped DRLs and the triple eye LED's are merged, making their placements look highly reminiscent of its bigger LC coupe along with a reworked cabin and rear tail lamp design. Base models now come standard with Amazon Alexa integration and a 4G LTE Wi-Fi hotspot.

For the 2019 model year US market, the regular Lexus RC is offered as RC 300 and RC 350. Both models are available as rear wheel drive or AWD, as well as the choice of base or F Sport trim levels, which makes the total of 8 models to choose from.

In most European countries, other than the high performance RC F, only the rear wheel drive RC 300h is offered as the base, F Sport, and special edition called Takumi. The RC300 h Takumi comes with multi-spoke 19-inch alloys and a 17-speaker Mark Levinson sound system. In South Africa, the RC 350 is the base model, with the RC F as the flagship model.

The RC 350 RWD does the  sprint in 5.7 seconds.

Following the introduction of stricter crash safety regulations, the RC, along with the IS sedan and the CT hatchback, were pulled out from the Australian market in November 2021.

RC F 

The RC F is a high performance version of the RC. The vehicle was unveiled in the 2014 North American International Auto Show. It went on sale in the United States in November 2014 as a 2015 model year vehicle. It was set to go on sale in Japan in the second half of 2014.

It is coupled to a Toyota AA80E 8-speed transmission built by Aisin AW.
The RC F has Brembo four-wheel power assisted disc brakes with anti-lock braking system (ABS), electronic brake force distribution (EBD) and brake assist (BA), and 255/35R19 front and 275/35R19 rear tires.

The RC F is equipped with vertical G-sensor for VDIM, rear Torsen or Torque Vectoring Differential (TVD) with three operating modes (Standard, Slalom, or Track), monotube gas-filled shock absorbers and ball-jointed stabilizer bars, new 19-inch BBS forged aluminum wheels, spindle grille with F-mesh pattern on the lower half, unique front hood which raises the peak of the vehicle, hood air vent from the LFA, front cooling ducts, front fender ducts in the L shape, exclusive combination meters from LFA (a large centrally mounted tachometer that alters according to drive mode, digital and analog speedometer, differential torque vectoring monitor, G-force meter, oil and water temperature gauges, mileage information and a stopwatch), and an elliptical cross-section thick grip steering wheel.

The aerodynamic package includes an active rear spoiler, tuning of the underbody, the intakes in the grille and the front fender vents and aero stabilizing fins.

The carbon fiber optional package, known in Japan as Carbon Exterior Package, includes a clear coated carbon fiber roof, active rear spoiler, and carbon fiber engine hood. The carbon fiber package parts for the RC F were made at the Aichi plant after the end of the LFA production.

To celebrate the 10th-anniversary of Lexus F high performance models, a limited edition RC F was released for the 2018 model year US market. All of the limited edition RC F come in matte-finished Nebula Gray paint with gloss black wheels and bright blue brake calipers. Inside they are equipped with blue leather seats, steering wheel and shift knob, blue suede dashboard cover above the instrument cluster, and blue-silver carbon fiber power window switch panel.

RC F Track Edition/Performance Package (2019) 
The RC F Track Edition (or Performance Package) was unveiled at the January 2019 North American International Auto Show as the track-focused variant of the RC F. It has a similar styling direction to the other updated RC models. The car features performance upgrades and weighs  less than the standard RC F. Weight-saving measures include lighter 19-inch wheels, carbon-ceramic brake rotors, a titanium muffler and exhaust pipes and extensive usage of carbon fiber. The Track Edition began sales in April 2019 and is available in white or matte gray with red interior color.

Motorsports

Super Taikyu 

Being fielded Sard racing in 2015 and then after by several private teams such as Tracy Sports, the RC 350 has won several championships in Japan's Pirelli Super Taikyu Endurance series under the ST-3 class. The RC F is also a popular contender.

VLN 
Toyota Gazoo Racing also entered the Lexus RC alongside its siblings, the IS F and LFA, in the VLN (German: Veranstaltergemeinschaft Langstreckenpokal Nürburgring), a series of endurance races held at the Nürburgring circuit every year.

The RC utilised a modified version of its 2.0, 8AR-FTS, whereas the RC F too made use of a modified version of the 5.0 2UR-GSE. Chassis wise, the RC was closer to the production car as required by SP3T regulations.

The RC has set numerous pole positions within its class numerous times within the years, most notably with a time of 8 minutes 56 seconds at the full Nürburgring circuit in 2017, with the RC F winning its class (SPX) on the car's debut in 2015.

Super GT 

The RC F has given its name to a GT500 class competitor in the Super GT series in the 2014 season, replacing the SC430 that had been raced for 7 years. In its debut season, the car scored 4 victories by Team TOM'S at Okayama, Suzuka, and Buriram and Team ZENT Cerumo at Sportsland SUGO with the new technical regulations.

In 2015, Andrea Caldarelli and Ryō Hirakawa claimed two wins, whereas Daisuke Itō and James Rossiter claimed one win.  In the 2016 Super GT Series, the car claimed three wins, with Heikki Kovalainen and Kohei Hirate winning the title. The RC was replaced by the Lexus LC for the 2017 season.

IMSA 

3GT Racing, a partnership of Lexus and Paul Gentilozzi, developed a GT3-class RC F during 2016. The team entered two cars at the 2017 IMSA WeatherTech SportsCar Championship, with Scott Pruett, Sage Karam, Jack Hawksworth and Robert Alon as full-season drivers.

Sales

References

External links 

  RC (US)
  RC F (US)

RC
Cars introduced in 2013
2020s cars
Compact executive cars
Coupés
Rear-wheel-drive vehicles
All-wheel-drive vehicles